Poncirin is the 7-O-neohesperidoside of isosakuranetin. Poncirin can be extracted from trifoliate orange (Poncirus trifoliata).

References

External links

O-methylated flavanones
Flavanone glycosides
Flavonoids found in Rutaceae
Phenol ethers